The cuneiform sign šum is a common-use sign of the Amarna letters, the Epic of Gilgamesh, and other cuneiform texts (for example Hittite texts).

Linguistically, it has a syllabic usage for šum, as well as for tag, tak, and taq. It can also be used alphabetically for š, m, t, g, k, or q, and also as a replacement for the four vowels, of a, or e, or i, or u.

Epic of Gilgamesh usage
The šum sign usage in the Epic of Gilgamesh is as follows: (šum, 34 times, tag, 2, tak, 23, and taq, 7 times).

Amarna letters usage
A common usage of the šum cuneiform in the Amarna letters is for the Akkadian word šumma,, for English if. In the letters the strife with the Habiru, taking over cities, (city-states), the reference is, "If the pharaoh doesn't send the archer force, our town is lost!".

Gallery

References

 Parpola, 1971. The Standard Babylonian Epic of Gilgamesh, Parpola, Simo, Neo-Assyrian Text Corpus Project, c 1997, Tablet I thru Tablet XII, Index of Names, Sign List,

Cuneiform signs